Mirabad-e Arjormand (also Romanized as Mīrābād-e Arjormand; also known as Mīrābād and Pīrābād) is a village in Azizabad Rural District, in the Central District of Narmashir County, Kerman Province, Iran. At the 2006 census, its population was 747, in 154 families.

References 

Populated places in Narmashir County